The Sărmaşel gas field is a natural gas field located in Sărmaşu, Mureș County. It was discovered in 1909 and developed by Romgaz.  It began production in 1912 and produces natural gas and condensates. The total proven reserves of the Sărmășel gas field are around 354 billion cubic feet (10 km³), and production is slated to be around 71 million cubic feet/day (2×105m³) in 2010.

References

Natural gas fields in Romania